The Dead Lands is a 2014 New Zealand action film directed by Toa Fraser. It was screened in the Special Presentations section at the 2014 Toronto International Film Festival where it had its world premier on 4 September 2014. It was selected as the New Zealand entry for the Best Foreign Language Film at the 87th Academy Awards, but was not nominated.

Plot
Tane, a Māori chief, his 15-year-old son Hongi and their tribe allow a rival tribe access to the remains of the second tribe's fallen warriors. Hongi does not trust the rival tribe's leader, Wirepa, and follows him. As Hongi suspected, the visit is a ruse, and Wirepa desecrates the grave site as a pretext for war, blaming Hongi for disturbing the remains. Tane believes his son is innocent, but offers to kill Hongi if it will prevent war. Wirepa refuses, saying war is imminent. Wirepa's tribe returns later in force, kills the men of the tribe and beheads Tane, taking his head as a trophy. Hongi is knocked away from the battle, and survives.

Hongi leaves and attempts to track down Wirepa. On the way, he discovers that Wirepa and his men have entered the Dead Lands, an area where any who venture in are believed to be killed by a monster known as a Taniwha in Maori mythology. Hongi, suspecting that the monster is in fact a man, tracks him down and, although reluctant, the monster agrees to help Hongi hunt down Wirepa. The monster is in fact a warrior (who is never named in the film) who murdered all the men of his own tribe, and he kills anyone who ventures there to prevent his tribe's historic lands from being occupied. The warrior is motivated by a desire to redeem himself and thus be led to the afterlife by his vengeful ancestors.

While tracking down Wirepa, Hongi has a series of visions of his long dead grandmother, who helps them on their way. Hongi and the warrior track down Wirepa and kill several of his men before Wirepa flees with his surviving warriors. Hongi and the warrior go after them, and the warrior kills a small band of hunters they come across to keep his identity a secret. Hongi is devastated by this, and screams at the warrior. The two separate, but the warrior has a vision from his ancestors that convinces him to continue helping Hongi.

Wirepa and his men are tracked to a mountaintop fort, where they barricade themselves inside. Wirepa taunts Hongi with his fathers head, angering him, but the warrior convinces him to regroup and return later. Wirepa's men leave Tane's head on a spike, and most of the men leave the fort. Again, this is a ruse by Wirepa to lure Hongi in. However, when the trap is sprung, the warrior and Hongi get the upper hand and kill most of Wirepa's men. While Hongi battles Wirepa, the warrior is severely wounded but manages to return and save Hongi. Wirepa, distracted from his battle with Hongi, beats the warrior to the ground before returning his attention to Hongi. This time Hongi gains the upper hand, and is about to kill Wirepa. This pleases Wirepa, because it will allow him to be remembered as a great warrior who died in battle about whom songs will be sung, and stories will be told. Hongi denies Wirepa this honor, spares his life and makes him swear to leave his land, and allows him to leave. Defeated and alone, Wirepa walks off in shame.

Hongi returns to the warrior, who is mortally wounded. Hongi adopts the warrior into his tribe, so that his own ancestors will guide the warrior into the afterlife. The film ends with a final vision of Hongi's grandmother, who is very pleased, as Hongi begins his return home.

Cast
 James Rolleston as Hongi
 Lawrence Makoare as The Warrior
 Rena Owen as the Grandmother 
 Te Kohe Tuhaka as Wirepa
 Xavier Horan as Rangi
 Raukura Turei as Mehe
 George Henare as Tane
 Matariki Whatarau as Tama

Reception
The film received mixed reviews. It has a 69% approval rating on Rotten Tomatoes based on 51 reviews, with an average rating of 6.1/10. The critics consensus reads: "The Dead Lands doesn't add anything new to the primeval quest genre, but its battle scenes boast enough visceral thrills to carry viewers through the more mundane moments." According to Metacritic, which sampled 14 critics and calculated an weighted average score of 59 out of 100, the film received "mixed or average reviews". Simon Abrams of RogerEbert.com gave the film 2 stars out of 4. Deborah Young of The Hollywood Reporter put it in her top ten films of the year.

TV adaptation

In 2019, AMC Entertainment's streaming service Shudder and TVNZ said they would create a TV series based on the film. The first two episodes of The Dead Lands premiered on 23 January 2020 on Shudder's platforms followed by TVNZ shortly afterwards with later shown on both Shudder and TVNZ OnDemand.

Awards and nominations

See also
 List of submissions to the 87th Academy Awards for Best Foreign Language Film
 List of New Zealand submissions for the Academy Award for Best Foreign Language Film
 The Dead Lands (television series)

References

External links
 

2014 films
2014 action films
Māori-language films
New Zealand action films
New Zealand films about revenge
Films about Māori people
Works about Māori people